Below is a list of notable hedge funds.

Largest hedge fund firms 
Below are the 20 largest hedge funds in the world ranked by discretionary assets under management (AUM) as of mid-2022. Only assets in private funds following hedge fund strategies are counted. Some of these managers also manage public funds and offer non-hedge fund strategies.

The data for this table comes from Pensions & Investments with data compiled in the second quarter of 2022.

Notable hedge fund firms

Americas

 Acadian Asset Management
 Adage Capital Management
 AlphaSimplex Group
 Altimeter Capital
 Angelo Gordon
 Appaloosa Management
 AQR Capital Management
 Archegos Capital Management
 Assured Investment Management
 Atlantic Investment Management
 Aurelius Capital Management
 Avenue Capital Group
 Balyasny Asset Management
 Bracebridge Capital
 Bridgewater Associates
 Canyon Capital Advisors
 Citadel LLC
 Coatue Management
 D. E. Shaw & Co.
 D1 Capital Partners
 Davidson Kempner Capital Management
 Discovery Capital Management
 Dragoneer Investment Group
 Ellington Management Group
 Elliott Investment Management
 ESL Investments
 ExodusPoint Capital Management
 Farallon Capital
 Fortress Investment Group
 GCM Grosvenor
 Glenview Capital Management
 GoldenTree Asset Management
 Graham Capital Management
 Gramercy Funds Management
 Greenlight Capital
 Harbinger Capital
 HBK Investments
 Highbridge Capital Management
 Highfields Capital Management
 Indus Capital Partners
 JANA Partners LLC
 K2 Advisors
 King Street Capital Management
 Lone Pine Capital
 Magnetar Capital
 Marathon Asset Management
 Maverick Capital
 Millennium Management, LLC
 Moore Capital Management
 OrbiMed
 Ospraie Management, LLC
 PanAgora Asset Management
 Pantera Capital
 Paulson & Co.
 PDT Partners
 Permian Investment Partners
 Pershing Square Capital Management
 Renaissance Technologies
 Revere Capital Advisors
 Schonfeld Strategic Advisors
 Sculptor Capital Management
 Silver Point Capital
 SkyBridge Capital
 Squarepoint Capital
 TGS Management
 Third Point Management
 Tiger Global Management
 Touradji Capital Management
 Tudor Investment Corporation
 Tsai Capital
 Two Sigma
 Universa Investments
 ValueAct Capital
 Viking Global Investors
 Wellington Management Company
 WorldQuant
 Wynnefield Capital
 York Capital Management

Asia

 Dymon Asia
 High-Flyer
 Hillhouse Capital Group
 Maso Capital
 Platinum Asset Management
 Quantedge
 SPARX Group
 Tybourne Capital Management
 Ubiquant
 Value Partners

EMEA

 Aspect Capital
 BlueCrest Capital Management
 Brevan Howard
 Capital Fund Management
 Capula Investment Management
 Caxton Associates
 Cheyne Capital
 CQS
 Egerton Capital
 Fusion Asset Management
 G-Research
 GLG Partners
 Man Group
 Marshall Wace
 Montreux Healthcare Fund
 Pharo Management
 Quality Capital Management
 Rokos Capital Management
 Ruffer
 Scipion Capital
 The Children's Investment Fund Management
 Toscafund Asset Management
 Winton Group

See also 
 List of private-equity firms
 Boutique investment bank
 List of venture capital firms
 Sovereign wealth fund
 List of exchange-traded funds

References 

Hedge funds
Hedge funds